Kunë Island is an island located off the coast of Albania in the Adriatic Sea. Kunë island features extravagant and varied plant life, including plants such as small Mediterranean shrubs to ash and willow forests. Wildlife is abundant as well. The island is home to around seventy species of birds, twenty-two species of reptiles, six species of amphibians and twenty-three species of mammals.

Nearby are the beaches of Tale and Kunë which goes by the same name.

See also 
 Kunë-Vain-Tale Nature Reserve

References 

Islands of Albania
Islands of the Adriatic Sea
Geography of Lezhë County